The Cat On The Mat Is Flat (2006) is a book similar to The Bad Book written by Andy Griffiths, who wrote the Just! series. The book is illustrated by Terry Denton, who has worked previously with Griffiths. The Cat On The Mat Is Flat uses larger fonts and pictures, and parodies the style of Dr. Seuss books, with the title being an obvious parody of The Cat in the Hat.

Stories (in chronological order)
The Cat On The Mat Is Flat contains nine rhymes altogether.

The Cat, The Rat, The Mat and the Baseball Bat
Ed and Ted and Ted’s Dog Fred
Pinky Ponky the Shonky, Wonky Bonky Donkey
Frog on a Log in a Bog
Harry Black, the Sack, the Snack and a Sneaky Snack Stealing Yak called Jack
Duck in a Truck in the Muck
Unlucky Lou, a kind Kangaroo, a hole in a Shoe and some Extra-Super-Fast-Sticking Super Roo Glue
Bill and Phil and the Very Big Hill
Andy G, Terry D, The Brave Tea Lady and the Evil Bee

Trivia

Most of the illustrations are stick figures.
After 'Andy G, Terry D, The Brave Tea Lady and the Evil Bee', there are the tests from the Just! series, plus the poem from the back of The Bad Book, and a sneak peek of What Bumosaur is That?

External links
 Publisher's page

2006 short story collections
Short story collections by Andy Griffiths
Dr. Seuss parodies
2006 children's books
Children's short story collections
Pan Books books